James Reka (aka "REKA" and "Reka One") is a street artist from Melbourne, Australia, later based in Berlin, Germany. Reka first started as a graffiti artist in the 1990s, moving to street art including large murals later.

His work is in the permanent collection of the National Gallery of Australia and he has exhibited worldwide. He participated in the Dulwich Outdoor Gallery associated with Dulwich Picture Gallery, southeast London. In 2019 he created a large mural work for the Venice Biennale entitled The Doge and The Gondolier.

See also
 Backwoods Gallery, Melbourne, Australia

References

External links
 RekaOne website

Year of birth missing
People from Melbourne
Australian artists
Street artists